Neven Majstorović (born 17 March 1989) is a Serbian former professional volleyball player, a member of the Serbian national team. The 2019 European Champion and the 2016 World League winner.

Honours

Clubs
 National championships
 2007/2008  Serbian Championship, with OK Crvena Zvezda
 2008/2009  Serbian Cup, with OK Crvena Zvezda
 2010/2011  Serbian Cup, with OK Crvena Zvezda
 2017/2018  Romanian SuperCup, with CS Arcada Galați

References

External links
 
 Player profile at PlusLiga.pl 
 Player profile at Volleybox.net

1989 births
Living people
Sportspeople from Belgrade
Serbian men's volleyball players
European champions for Serbia
Serbian expatriate sportspeople in Poland
Expatriate volleyball players in Poland
Serbian expatriate sportspeople in France
Expatriate volleyball players in France
Serbian expatriate sportspeople in Romania
Expatriate volleyball players in Romania
LKPS Lublin players
Liberos